Pomaderris obcordata, commonly known as wedge-leaved pomaderris, is a species of flowering plant in the family Rhamnaceae and is endemic to South Australia. It is a shrub with densely hairy branchlets, wedge-shaped, narrowly egg-shaped or heart-shaped leaves with the narrower end towards the base, and white to pink flowers.

Description
The upper surface of the leaves is glabrous and the lower surface is covered with woolly, star-shaped hairs. Flowering mainly occurs from July to September.

Taxonomy
Pomaderris obcordata was first formally described in 1837 by Eduard Fenzl in Enumeratio plantarum quas in Novae Hollandiae ora austro-occidentali ad fluvium Cygnorum et in sinu Regis Georgii collegit Carolus Liber Baro de Hügel from specimens collected by Ferdinand Bauer. The specific epithet (obcordata) means "inverted heart-shaped".

Distribution and habitat
Wedge-leaved pomaderris grows in mallee scrub, or heath and occurs in south-eastern South Australia, including on the Eyre and Yorke Peninsulas and Kangaroo Island. There are two records from far western Victoria, the most recent from 1969, but may be examples of inaccurate locality recording.

References

Flora of South Australia
obcordata
Plants described in 1837
Taxa named by Eduard Fenzl